is a 2002 Japanese television drama that aired on Fuji Television.

See also
 List of Japanese television dramas

External links
 Official website 

Japanese drama television series
2002 Japanese television series debuts
2002 Japanese television series endings
Fuji TV dramas